Gynnidomorpha mesoxutha is a species of moth of the family Tortricidae. It is found in Sri Lanka, India and northern Australia.

The wingspan is about 11 mm. The forewings are whitish ochreous with ochreous-brown markings. The hindwings are pale grey.

References

Moths described in 1916
Cochylini